Edward A. Sales (1861–1912) was a Major League Baseball shortstop. He played for the Pittsburgh Alleghenys of the National League during the 1890 season.

Sales began his professional career with Chambersburg and Shippensburg in 1884.  His overall minor league statistics were respectable, with a .287 batting average.  During his time in the minors he was also a pitcher, with an earned run average of 2.72.  After his season with the Pittsburgh Alleghenys, he continued to play minor league baseball in New York and Pennsylvania through the 1897 season.

Sources

Major League Baseball shortstops
Pittsburgh Alleghenys players
Baseball players from Harrisburg, Pennsylvania
1861 births
1912 deaths
19th-century baseball players
Harrisburg Olympics players
Chambersburg (minor league baseball) players
Binghamton Crickets (1880s) players
Wilkes-Barre Coal Barons players
Toledo Maumees (minor league) players
Hamilton Hams players
New Haven Nutmegs players
Syracuse Stars (minor league baseball) players
Troy Trojans (minor league) players
Albany Senators players
Philadelphia Athletics (minor league) players
Utica Stars players
Harrisburg Senators players
Lancaster Chicks players
Carbondale Anthracites players
Williamsport Demorest Bicycle Boys players